Bahrani Arabic (also known as Bahrani and Baharna Arabic) is a variety of Arabic spoken by the Baharna in Eastern Arabia and Oman. In Bahrain, the dialect is primarily spoken in Shia villages and some parts of Manama. In Saudi Arabia, the dialect is spoken in the governorate of Qatif.

The Bahrani Arabic dialect has been significantly influenced by the ancient Aramaic, Syriac, and Akkadian languages.

An interesting sociolinguistic feature of Bahrain is the existence of two main dialects: Bahrani and Sunni Arabic. Sunni Bahrainis speak a dialect which is most similar to urban dialect spoken in Qatar.

The Persian language has the most foreign linguistic influence on all the Bahraini dialects. The differences between Bahrani Arabic and other Bahraini dialects suggest differing historical origins. The main differences between Bahrani and non-Bahrani dialects are evident in certain grammatical forms and pronunciation. Most of the vocabulary, however, is shared between dialects, or is distinctly Bahraini, arising from a shared modern history. Many Bahrani words have also been borrowed from Urdu, Ottoman Turkish, or English.

Examples of words borrowed from other languages 
 bānka 'ceiling fan' from Persian
 sōmān 'equipment' from Urdu.
 lētar 'lighter' from English.
 wīl 'wheel' from English
 tēm 'time' from English
 dareesha 'window' from Ottoman Turkish
 dowshag  'mattress' from Persian
 orradi 'already' from English
 leitāt 'lights' from English

Bahrani dialect has borrowed some vocabulary from Persian, Urdu, Ottoman Turkish, and more recently from English.

Features 
Holes divides the sedentary dialects of the Gulf to two types:
 Type A, which includes the dialects of Sunni tribes that settled in Eastern Arabia between the 17th and 19th century, and the Huwala. This group includes the standard Gulf Arabic dialects of Kuwait, Qatar, Bahrain, and UAE.
 Type B, which includes the dialects of Omani Ibadis and Eastern Arabian Shia (the Baharna).
Bahrani Arabic (called Baħrāni by its speakers) shares many features with surrounding Type A dialects (e.g. Kuwait, UAE, Qatar). Some general features:
 Classical Arabic /q/ becomes /g/, for example gamar (moon).
 Classical Arabic /ð/ becomes /d/, for example danab (tail).
 /q/ and /ð/ is preserved for some Classical Arabic borrowings, for example [ðulqaʕdah] (Dhu Al-Qa'dah).
 Affrication of /k/ to /tʃ/ in many words, for example [tʃalb] (dog).
 /θ/ has the free variant /f/, and in some dialects /t/, for example falāfeh or talāteh (three).
 /dʒ/ becomes /j/ in some rural dialects, for example yiħħe (watermelon).
 Usage of -sh suffix (/ʃ/) as a feminine second-person pronoun akin to masculine -k, for example babish (your door).
 Usage of sentence-final particle e (pronounced [ɛː]) to indicate questions, for example 'inzaine (OK?).

Phonology

See also
 Varieties of Arabic
 Peninsular Arabic

References

Further reading
 Mahdi Abdalla Al-Tajir. 1983. Language and Linguistic Origins in Bahrain: The Bahrani Dialect of Arabic. 
 Clive Holes.  1983.  "Bahraini Dialects:  Sectarian Differences and the Sedentary/Nomadic Split," Zeitschrift für arabische Linguistik 10:7-38.
 Clive Holes. 1987. Language Variation and Change in a Modernising Arab State: The Case of Bahrain. 
 Clive Holes. 2001. Dialect, Culture, and Society in Eastern Arabia: Glossary. 
 Clive Holes, "Dialect and National Identity. The Cultural Politics of Self-Representation in Bahraini Musalsalat", in Paul Dresch and James Piscatori (eds), Monarchies and Nations: Globalisation and Identity in the Arab states of the Gulf, London: I.B. Tauris, 2005, p. 60.

External links

 Baharna Arabic Travel Phrases
 Dialects of the Arabian Peninsula

Languages of Saudi Arabia
Languages of Bahrain
Languages of Oman
Arabic languages
Mashriqi Arabic
Peninsular Arabic